Haverstraw Bay, located in New York, is the widest portion of the Hudson River. The bay is bordered by the village of Haverstraw, in Rockland County, to the west and the village of Croton-on-Hudson, in Westchester County, to the east.

Geography 
Haverstraw Bay is bordered to the west by the town and village of Haverstraw and to the east by the northern portion of the town of Ossining, village of Croton-on-Hudson and the southern portion of the town of Cortlandt. Haverstraw Bay is approximately 35 miles (56 kilometers) to the north of New York City. A major feature of the bay is the large peninsula that forms its southern downstream border, Croton Point, which juts almost halfway across the Hudson from the eastern shore. Croton Point Park is a popular birding location, including  frequent sightings of the bald eagle. The moderately saline bay is the northern, upstream boundary of the lower Hudson River estuary.

Ecology 
The bay's physical and biological characteristics make it one of the most significant estuarine areas in the Hudson River.  The bay is deeper on its western side with a shipping channel of minimum 32 feet in depth and 300 feet in width. The bay's eastern side is shallower with most of that section of bay not more than 10 feet deep. Shallow depths with ample sunlight lead to robust aquatic vegetation. Inflows of brackish Atlantic Ocean water overlaid with fresh stream water promote a nutrient rich environment for myriad invertebrate, fish, and bird species. The bay's ecology plays a central role in the health of fish populations in the Hudson River, including the endangered shortnose sturgeon and the larger, more abundant atlantic sturgeon. New York State has designated Haverstraw Bay a "Significant Coastal Fish and Wildlife Habitat". Up to the mid-1950s, Haverstraw Bay was once a productive oyster habitat. As with the rest of the Hudson, at the microbial level the bay's health is by oxygen concentrations. The bay's water chemistry is affected rain fall, tidal variations, and human induced waste and runoff, as well as seasonal changes in temperature and light.

History 

In 1609, the Dutch East India Company had financed English navigator Henry Hudson to search for the Northwest Passage. In an attempt to find this undiscovered route, Henry Hudson decided to sail his ship up the river that would later be named after him (Hudson River). As he continued up the river, its width expanded, into Haverstraw Bay, leading him to believe he had successfully reached the Northwest Passage.

In 1780, spy Major John André landed at Snedeker's Landing (a.k.a. Waldberg Landing) on the west shore of the bay in the woods below Haverstraw village to meet Benedict Arnold.

In 1801, Charles Willson Peale traveled up the Hudson and sketched Stony Point from the bay.

The bay appears in the 1975 James Lincoln Collier and Christopher Collier novel, My Brother Sam Is Dead.

The bay is currently traversed by NY Waterway's Haverstraw–Ossining Ferry.

Tourism

Landmarks and places of Interest
Rockland County September 11 Memorial at Haverstraw Bay Park.

References

External links
 Hudson River Almanac 
 Testimony on Haverstraw Bay as ecological engine of the Hudson River to NAOA (2002)
 Lower Hudson River Estuary's Characteristics
 Microbial Ecology of the Hudson River Estuary
 Birding in Haverstraw Bay 

Hudson River
Bays of New York (state)
Bodies of water of Rockland County, New York
Bays of Westchester County, New York